Tito Strozzi may refer to:

 Tito Vespasiano Strozzi (1424–c. 1505), Italian poet
  (1892–1970), Croatian actor and writer